The South Branch Kishwaukee River is a  tributary of the Kishwaukee River in northern Illinois. The South Branch flows through DeKalb County; in 2007 flooding along the tributary inundated areas of DeKalb County and Sycamore, Illinois.

Another stream, also named South Branch Kishwaukee River, flows through Kane County and McHenry County, joining the main stem of the Kishwaukee east of Marengo.

Course
The South Branch Kishwaukee River, a major tributary of the Kishwaukee River, originates on the Cropsey Moraine, near Shabbona, Illinois. The stream flows in a northeast direction until it comes to Genoa, where it makes a westerly turn and begins flowing west-northwest.

Of all tributaries of the Kishwaukee, the South Branch is the largest in terms of the area drained. 

The South Branch flows through DeKalb County, Illinois, draining  of land area.

Description
Part of the South Branch's river bed is the plain of an ancient lake. The river wanders over moraines throughout its course. The substrate is rock strewn with sand and gravel; north of Sycamore the river has been mined for gravel. It has the lowest natural flow rate of any stream in the Kishwaukee River watershed. The stream, however, also receives the largest discharge of any of the streams in the watershed due to treated wastewater from the city of DeKalb.

The assessment looked at overall resource quality and determined the factors responsible for lower quality conditions were "nutrients and organic enrichment (low dissolved oxygen) from agriculture and municipal point source pollution."

Flooding
Dating back to 1926 the South Branch has risen above flood stage nine times. The record flood occurred on July 2, 1983, when the river reached . Flash flooding, which predominantly occurs in mid to late summer, can occur throughout the county in low-lying areas on the flood plain. Flooding resulting in a federal disaster declaration occurred in 1973, 1974, 1993, 1996 and 2007.

After  of rain fell on August 23 and 24, 2007, at DeKalb, the South Branch Kishwaukee River rose to its highest level since 1983 and its second highest level in recorded history. Numerous roads and bridges were closed, and the cities of DeKalb and Sycamore declared local emergencies. Federal disaster aid was made available when President George W. Bush declared DeKalb, Grundy, Kane, LaSalle, Lake, and Will counties, in northern Illinois, "major disaster" areas. The federal funding made individual assistance available to flood victims in Lake, Will and Grundy counties, and individual and public assistance available to those in DeKalb, Kane and LaSalle counties. In DeKalb and Sycamore, about 600 residents were displaced from their homes, and the DeKalb campus of Northern Illinois University was closed because of the flood.

See also
2007 Midwest flooding
Owens Creek (Kishwaukee River)

References

Kishwaukee South
Kishwaukee, South
Rivers of Illinois